The White Dawn is a 1974 Canadian-American drama film directed by Philip Kaufman and starring Warren Oates, Timothy Bottoms, and Louis Gossett Jr. It portrays the conflict between aboriginal peoples' traditional way of life and Europeans' eagerness to take advantage of them. The film employs authentic Inuit language dialogue. It is based on the 1971 novel The White Dawn: An Eskimo Saga by James Archibald Houston, who co-wrote the screenplay.

Premise
When three whalers become stranded in Northern Canada's Arctic in 1896, they are rescued by Inuit. In the beginning, the Inuit accept the strangers' European ways, but as this increasingly influences and affects their customs, things slowly fall apart and cultural tension grows until the climax. The film was made by a "skeleton crew" and was filmed "entirely on location" on Baffin Island. The three lead actors were the only ones with any film experience and the other performers were Inuit who were speaking their own language, which was subtitled in the film.

Cast
Warren Oates as Billy
Timothy Bottoms as Daggett
Louis Gossett Jr. as Portagee
Joanasie Salomonie as Kangiak
Ann Meekitjuk Hanson (credited under the pseudonym Pilitak) as Neevee 
Simonie Kopapik as Sarkak 
Namonai Ashoona as Nowya
Tchomalai as Ratchepa
Higa Ipeelie as Evaloo
Oolipika Joamie as Mia
Meetook Mallee as Ikuma
Neelak as Panee
Seemee Nookiguak as Avinga

Release
The film featured nudity of the female Inuit and scenes of hunting and was initially given an R rating in the United States which Vincent Canby of The New York Times called absurd and baffled other people in the industry, with the Movie Report, which advised young people and parents on the content of films, telling its readers to ignore the rating. After an initial appeal, the MPAA did not revise the rating but later reduced it to a PG-Rating.

Critical reception

In a generally negative review, Vincent Canby wrote, "As an Arctic travelogue, it is sometimes so striking that I spent much of the time wondering how certain scenes were photographed; long shots of men walking across ice-flows, the killing of a polar bear, a walrus hunt, the capsizing of a boat that sends the actors into icy water." Canby described the plot as "bland" and concluded that "It's the story of how the three sailors have the bad judgment to be so rude and boorish to their hosts that they invite a fate that they never understand." In a 2004 review following the release of  the DVD, David Sanjek wrote, "The White Dawn is episodic, devoid of a now familiar hyped-up velocity. As a consequence, some may find it slow, while others may appreciate its attention to ethnographic detail and refusal to succumb to stereotypes. Even if the voyage made by Billy, Daggett and Portagee ends in calamity, it remains a trip well worth making and a reminder of the diversity of Hollywood fare before focus groups."

References

External links

1974 films
American drama films
Canadian drama films
English-language Canadian films
1970s English-language films
Inuktitut-language films
Films based on Canadian novels
Films directed by Philip Kaufman
Films set in the Arctic
Films set in 1896
Inuit films
Films about Inuit in Canada
1974 drama films
Films scored by Henry Mancini
Paramount Pictures films
American survival films
Canadian survival films
Filmways films
1970s American films
1970s Canadian films